Newsfail: Climate Change, Feminism, Gun Control, and Other Fun Stuff We Talk About Because Nobody Else Will is a book written by Jamie Kilstein and Allison Kilkenny, hosts of internet radio show Citizen Radio. The book was published by Simon & Schuster in 2014.

References

External links 
Publisher book page

Books about media bias
Books about politics of the United States